Koala Man is an Australian-American superhero animated sitcom created by Michael Cusack for Hulu. Developed by Cusack, Dan Hernandez, and Benji Samit, the series premiered on January 9, 2023 on Hulu in the United States and on Disney+ in Australia.

Plot
The series takes place in an alternate universe called "Bushworld", where the sinking of the Titanic never happened, indirectly resulting in the United States of America being destroyed (except Hollywood, which became an island), Australia becoming the world's superpower, and Nicole Kidman becoming its Queen. The story follows Kevin Williams, an average middle-aged family man who decides to issue justice to the town of Dapto as the incredibly average superhero Koala Man. Possessing no powers and a simple costume, which is apparently enough to hide his identity, Kevin encounters a variety of evildoers that wish to do harm to his town. Kevin is joined by his family who put up with his misadventures including his down-to-earth wife Vicky, his two 14-year-old twins, a popularity-obsessed daughter Alison and a nerdy son Liam who secretly possesses psychic powers.

Cast

Main
 Michael Cusack as Kevin Williams/Koala Man, a father and IT expert who moonlights as a low-rent superhero
 Cusack also voices:
 Liam Williams, Kevin's son who possesses psychic powers
 Damo and Darren, a pair of low-level criminals
 The Tall Poppy
 The Great One
 Nicole Kidman, the queen of Australia
 Huge Greg, Big Greg's older brother
 Various characters
 Sarah Snook as Vicky Williams, Kevin's wife, who works at the school canteen
 Demi Lardner as Alison Williams, Kevin's daughter

Guest
 Hugh Jackman as Big Greg, a beloved celebrity fishing expert and the head of the town council, who is Kevin's boss
 Jemaine Clement as Principal Bazwell/Christopher/The Kookaburra, the ineffectual principal of North Dapto High who is Vicky's boss and reveals himself as a supervillain.
 Alexandra Daddario as Herself
 Rachel House as Janine, Vicky's friend and co-worker at the school canteen
 House also voices Louise, the owner of the local bowling club who harbours an attraction to Koala Man
 Angus Sampson as General Peckmeister, Wizened Garbage Man, Summer Santa and many more. 
 Jordan Shanks as the Town Shopkeeper, Chippy, Snuff film victim
 Hugo Weaving as King Emudeus
 Justin Roiland (season 1 only) as Chad Wagon, an American who wants to turn Australia into a second United States
 Jarrad Wright as Spider, Kevin's boorish next door neighbour
 Wright also voices:
 Maxwell, a wheelchair-bound septuagenarian with a long complicated history
 Maxwell's father
 Various characters
 Michelle Brasier as McKayla Taylor Mercedes, a popular girl who speaks with a vocal fry and Alison's initial nemesis
 Miranda Otto as Mindy, a koala that Kevin found and cared for before she died after being hit by a car before the events of the series.
 Claudia O'Doherty as Rosie Yodels/Rosie 2, the most popular girl in school
 O'Doherty also voices:
 Rosie 1 and Rosie 3, Rosie's sister clones who want to take over Australia
 Tanya, a fish who is Huge Greg's wife
 Various characters
 Natalie Tran as Lulu Liu, Neighbour
 Nisrine Amine as The Egyptian Mummy, a survivor of the Titanic who became US president and fled to the moon
 Anthony Salame, Jordan Shanks, and Steph Tisdell as The Tradies, corrupt tradespeople who secretly run every working aspect of Dapto and possess supernatural abilities.
 Michelle Brazier, Leigh Joel Scott, Anthony Salame, and Ian Zaro as The Tigglies, villainous parodies of the Wiggles who kill their victims, which are children, by draining them of their youth.
 Liam McIntyre as Emus
 Nazeem Hussain as Clarko
 Nina Oyama as Little Nina

Episodes

Production
It was announced in March 2021 that Hulu had given a series order for the show. Michael Cusack, who is the creator, voices the titular character, with Hugh Jackman, Sarah Snook and Demi Lardner joining the voice cast. In October 2022, Jemaine Clement, Rachel House and Jarrad Wright joined the cast, with Miranda Otto and Hugo Weaving announced to be making guest appearances. 

On January 25, 2023, Justin Roiland was removed from the show, alongside sister show Solar Opposites, after he was charged with felony domestic abuse. Both shows are produced by 20th Television, via their 20th Television Animation division.

Release
The series premiered on January 9, 2023, on Hulu in the United States, in Australia and other international territories on Disney+ via Star Hub and Latin America on Star+.

Reception 
Season 1 has received generally positive reviews from critics. On Rotten Tomatoes, season 1 has an approval rating of 86% based on reviews from 14 critics, with an average rating of 6.8/10. The website's critical consensus states, "While Koala Man can feel like a hodgepodge of quirky ideas, its distinctive Australian identity gives it a pungent personality."

References

External links
 

American adult animated comedy television series
Australian adult animated comedy television series
American computer-animated television series
Australian computer-animated television series
American flash adult animated television series
Australian flash animated television series
2020s American animated television series
2020s Australian animated television series
2020s American black comedy television series
2020s American surreal comedy television series
2023 American television series debuts
2023 Australian television series debuts
Hulu original programming
Alternate history television series
Animated television series about families
Television series by Justin Roiland's Solo Vanity Card Productions!
Television series by Fox Television Animation
Television series created by Michael Cusack
Television shows set in New South Wales
English-language television shows